Sorin Stoica (born January 5, 1976, in Romania) is an American soccer referee from Ohio. Stoica made his Major League Soccer refereeing debut in a 2012 match between the Houston Dynamo and the New York Red Bulls.

Notable matches
On September 8, 2013, Stoica sent off New England Revolution goalkeeper Matt Reis in the fifth minute after Reis fouled Montreal Impact forward Marco Di Vaio in the box. Reis had gone to ground to attempt to block a shot and tripped Di Vaio with his hand after Di Vaio misplayed the ball.

On July 5, 2015, Stoica sent off Orlando City SC star Kaká for the first time in the Brazilian's long career after the 31-year old midfielder stomped on a Real Salt Lake player.

On July 29, 2015, Stoica was the fourth official to Ismail Elfath for the 2015 MLS All-Star Game.

References

1976 births
Living people
American soccer referees
Romanian emigrants to the United States
Major League Soccer referees
North American Soccer League referees
Sportspeople from Ohio